James Francis Mason (1861–2 April 1929) was a British Conservative politician who was the Member of Parliament for Windsor in Berkshire from 1906 to 1918.

References

External links 
 Hansard

1861 births
1929 deaths
People from Windsor, Berkshire
Conservative Party (UK) MPs for English constituencies
Members of the Parliament of the United Kingdom for Windsor
UK MPs 1906–1910
UK MPs 1910–1918